Henri Cirelli (23 December 1934 – 25 September 2021) was a Luxembourger footballer who played as a midfielder.

Career
Born in Dudelange, Cirelli played club football for Alliance Dudelange, Beerschot A.C. and Avenir Beggen. He was also a member of the Luxembourg national team between 1956 and 1965, scoring six goals in 37 games. He later worked as a coach with a number of teams.

References

1934 births
2021 deaths
People from Dudelange
Luxembourgian footballers
Association football midfielders
Luxembourg international footballers
Luxembourg National Division players
Belgian Pro League players
Alliance Dudelange players
Beerschot A.C. players
FC Avenir Beggen players
Luxembourgian expatriate footballers
Luxembourgian expatriate sportspeople in Belgium
Expatriate footballers in Belgium